José 'Mehdi' Faria (April 26, 1933 – October 8, 2013) was a Brazilian football coach. He coached Morocco in the 1986 FIFA World Cup, when they became the first African team to advance to the second round.

He converted to Islam when coaching Morocco.

Managerial career
Faria started his managerial career in Fluminense's junior teams, where he worked for more than 10 years. He was responsible for the rise of many Brazilian stars, such as World Cup captain Edinho. He received many offers while working in Brazil. However, he rejected them all due to the risk involved. He eventually changed his mind, and accepted an offer to coach the Qatar under-20 team as a replacement for Evaristo de Macedo who temporarily took charge of Iraq in Mexico. He claimed to have made as much money in Qatar in two years as he had made in last 23 years.

He coached the Morocco national team from 1983 till 1988. He rejected an offer from Inter Milan while coaching the team, and converted to Islam, adopting the middle name of "Mehdi".

References

External links
Biography

1933 births
2013 deaths
Footballers from Rio de Janeiro (city)
Brazilian footballers
Association football midfielders
Bonsucesso Futebol Clube players
Fluminense FC players
Bangu Atlético Clube players
Brazilian football managers
Al Sadd SC managers
AS FAR (football) managers
Morocco national football team managers
Olympique Club de Khouribga managers
Qatar Stars League managers
Botola managers
1986 FIFA World Cup managers
1986 African Cup of Nations managers
1988 African Cup of Nations managers
Brazilian expatriate football managers
Brazilian expatriate sportspeople in Qatar
Brazilian expatriate sportspeople in Morocco
Expatriate football managers in Qatar
Expatriate football managers in Morocco
Brazilian emigrants to Morocco
Brazilian Muslims
Converts to Islam